Prelude Records was a New York-based independent record label that was active from 1976 to 1986. At one time, François Kevorkian held an A&R position at Prelude. The label's owner was Marvin Schlachter.

History
Prelude was first launched in 1976, renamed from Pye International Records, a US division of UK-based Pye Records which had begun in 1974. The name was derived from the music group Prelude, which recorded for Pye at the time. At the outset, Prelude's LP and 45 catalogue numbers were the same as had begun under Pye (US), with the prefix changed from PYE- to PRL-. For a very short period at the start, Pye's then-parent, ATV Music, owned Prelude.

It first made its small release with a large name called JUMBO, which spawned a minor hit with "Turn On To Love".

As disco music declined, Prelude was one of the few disco labels to survive its demise. In 1981 they pioneered the mastermix. with Shep Pettibone's "Kiss Mastermix 2x12". Having recruited Kevorkian, the label was able to focus on remixes; to change up an existing song by altering it slightly. "Disco Circus" by Martin Circus (1979) was and still is a cult classic, but failed to make significant sales according to Michael Gomes who began working for Prelude in 1979.

Prelude's biggest hits included "In the Bush" by Musique (1978), "Come to Me" by France Joli (1979), "A Little Bit of Jazz" by the Nick Straker Band and "Must Be the Music" by Secret Weapon (1981).

After its closure in 1986, Prelude's back catalogue was purchased by Unidisc.

Artists
9th Creation
Gayle Adams
Jocelyn Brown
CD III
D-Train
Gerald Mallory
Jeanette "Lady" Day
Empress
Hi-Gloss
Inner Life
France Joli
L.A.X.
Lorraine Johnson (1977, 78)
Macho
Dianne Marie
Dorothy Moore (1985)
Musique
Nick Straker Band
Peter Jacques Band
Sharon Redd
Vicki Sue Robinson
Saturday Night Band
Secret Weapon 
The Strikers
Unique
Unlimited Touch
Theo Vaness
Wuf Ticket

References

See also
List of record labels
Prelude at Discogs

American independent record labels
Defunct record labels of the United States
Post-disco record labels
Record labels established in 1976
1976 establishments in New York (state)